Eagle Creek is a  river located  northwest of Clifton, Arizona, United States, at the base of the White Mountain Range. It is a tributary of the Gila River.

Fish species 
 Smallmouth bass
 Channel catfish
 Flathead catfish
 Apache trout
 Carp

Coordinates 
 Latitude: 33°10'17.28"N
 Longitude: 109°29'55.22"W

See also
 List of rivers of Arizona

References

External links 
 Where to Fish in Arizona Species Information
 Arizona Boating Locations Facilities Map
 Arizona Lake Levels

White Mountains (Arizona)
Rivers of Arizona
Rivers of Greenlee County, Arizona
Tributaries of the Gila River